Pterostylis tanypoda, commonly known as the swan greenhood, is a species of greenhood orchid endemic to New Zealand. Both flowering and non-flowering plants have a rosette of leaves lying flat on the ground and flowering plants have up to seven crowded, inconspicuous bluish-green and white-striped flowers.

Description
Pterostylis tanypoda is a terrestrial, perennial, deciduous, herb with an underground tuber. The dorsal sepal and petals are fused, forming a hood or "galea" over the column. The lateral sepals are downturned and joined together. The labellum is short, broad and blunt with a dark green lobe on the upper end. Flowering occurs from October to January.

Taxonomy and naming
Pterostylis tanypoda was first formally described in 1997 by David Jones, Brian Molloy and Mark Clements from a specimen collected near Castle Hill. The description was published in The Orchadian. The specific epithet (tanypoda) is derived from the Ancient Greek words tany- meaning "long" and pous meaning "foot".

Distribution and habitat
This greenhood grows in montane and subalpine grassland on the eastern side of South Island between Marlborough and Southland.

References

tanypoda
Orchids of New Zealand
Plants described in 1997